Raurimu railway station was a station on the North Island Main Trunk, and in the Manawatū-Whanganui region.

It opened in 1906 and closed in 1978. It was known as Pukerimu from 1906 to 1908.

History 
In 1906 the administrative office of the northern section of the Public Works Department (PWD) which was building the NIMT was moved to a group of "tents and huts" at Raurimu, and at its zenith the Raurimu community numbered a thousand men, women and children.

Trains started running to Raurimu from 13 December 1906. From 10 May 1907 goods were carried to Raurimu by rail. Trains started running to the next station at Waimarino (National  Park) from 23 December 1907. The NIMT was opened to through Auckland to Wellington trains from 9 November 1908, though only southbound expresses stopped at Raurimu. 

Raurimu closed to passengers before December 1975,

The settlement of Raurimu in the early 20th century had two bush tramways for forestry; Knight's tram, Raurimu of the Raumiru Sawmilling Co (1935-1957) and a tramway of the Pokata Timber Co (1930-1957).

References

Buildings and structures in Manawatū-Whanganui
Rail transport in Manawatū-Whanganui
Railway stations opened in 1906
Railway stations closed in 1978
1906 establishments in New Zealand